Piz Buin is a mountain in the Silvretta range of the Alps on the border between Austria and Switzerland. It forms the border between the Swiss canton of Graubünden and the Austrian state of Vorarlberg and is the highest peak in Vorarlberg.

Its original name in the Romansh language is Piz Buin Grond. A similar but smaller summit nearby is called Piz Buin Pitschen at 3,255 m (10,680 ft). Piz Buin was first climbed on 14 July 1865 by Joseph Anton Specht and Johann Jakob Weilenmann, guided by Jakob Pfitscher and Franz Pöll. Piz Buin Pitschen was climbed three years later.

Piz Buin can be reached from the Wiesbadener hut, crossing the Vermunt glacier, climbing up the Wiesbadener ridge and hiking over the Ochsentaler Glacier to the Buin gap. From the gap there is a zigzag walk to the top, with only a 20 m (65 ft) steep step to surmount before reaching the relatively flat summit space, which has an old wooden cross on the very top. The border between Switzerland and Austria crosses the summit from East to West.

See also
List of mountains of Switzerland

References

External links

Piz Buin on Summitpost
Piz Buin on Hikr

Mountains of the Alps
Alpine three-thousanders
Mountains of Vorarlberg
Mountains of Switzerland
Mountains of Graubünden
Austria–Switzerland border
International mountains of Europe
Silvretta Alps
Scuol